Charles Eugene Bentley (April 30, 1841 – February 6, 1905) was an American politician who served as the presidential nominee of the National Party, an offshoot party created by the broad gaugers faction of the Prohibition Party, during the 1896 presidential election.

Life

Charles Eugene Bentley was born on April 30, 1841, in Warners, New York. On October 7, 1863, he married Persis Orilla Freeman and moved to Clinton, Iowa in 1866. Bentley served as city clerk, treasurer, and secretary of the board of education. In 1878, he moved to Surprise, Nebraska and later to Lincoln, Nebraska in 1890.

One of his children is Isaac Madison Bentley.

Politics

During the 1884 presidential election he left the Republican Party to join the Prohibition Party and supported former Kansas Governor John St. John. The first Prohibition state convention in Nebraska was held in 1884 and he was selected to serve as its chairman. In 1892, he was given the Prohibition nomination for governor and the nomination for Senate in 1894. In 1890, he selected as chairman of the Nebraska state Prohibition Committee and served again from 1895 to 1896, and was later elected as a member of the National Prohibition Committee in 1892.

In 1895, the Nebraska Prohibition Party passed a resolution at its convention endorsing Bentley for the party's presidential nomination. At the 1896 Prohibition convention he supported the broad gauger faction that wanted to add women's suffrage and free silver to the party's platform, but after the narrow gauger faction successfully defeated those attempts Bentley, John St. John, and Helen M. Gougar led a walkout of the broad gaugers and created the breakaway National Party and nominated a rival ticket with Bentley as president and James H. Southgate as vice president. Following the 1896 presidential election the majority of the National Party's members returned to the Prohibition Party, but Bentley remained in the party and served as the chairman of the Nebraska affiliate until his death.

Later life

On February 6, 1905, Bentley was visiting Los Angeles where he died from heart disease after being visited by an unknown woman and was found to be missing multiple valuables including his gold watch.

Electoral history

References

External links

1841 births
1905 deaths
19th-century Baptist ministers from the United States
Activists from New York (state)
Baptists from New York (state)
Candidates in the 1896 United States presidential election
Iowa Republicans
Nebraska Prohibitionists
Nebraska Republicans
New York (state) Republicans
People from Onondaga County, New York